Onley ("only") is a town in Accomack County, Virginia, United States. The population was 516 at the 2010 census.

History
The community was named after Onley, the estate of Governor Henry A. Wise.

Geography
Onley is located at  (37.690352, −75.716759).

It lies at an elevation of 43 feet.

Demographics

At the 2000 census there were 496 people, 223 households, and 144 families living in the town. The population density was 607.9 people per square mile (233.5/km). There were 271 housing units at an average density of 332.1 per square mile (127.6/km).  The racial makeup of the town was 83.27% White, 13.91% African American, 0.20% Native American, 0.40% Asian, 1.61% from other races, and 0.60% from two or more races. Hispanic or Latino of any race were 1.41%.

Of the 223 households 23.3% had children under the age of 18 living with them, 48.0% were married couples living together, 11.2% had a female householder with no husband present, and 35.4% were non-families. 32.7% of households were one person and 20.6% were one person aged 65 or older. The average household size was 2.22 and the average family size was 2.72.

The age distribution was 18.8% under the age of 18, 5.0% from 18 to 24, 24.8% from 25 to 44, 25.4% from 45 to 64, and 26.0% 65 or older. The median age was 46 years. For every 100 females, there were 84.4 males. For every 100 females age 18 and over, there were 78.3 males.

The median household income was $36,750 and the median family income  was $42,891. Males had a median income of $28,854 versus $21,964 for females. The per capita income for the town was $19,115. About 8.3% of families and 12.5% of the population were below the poverty line, including 13.4% of those under age 18 and 12.6% of those age 65 or over.

Climate
The climate in this area is characterized by hot, humid summers and generally mild to cool winters.  According to the Köppen Climate Classification system, Onley has a humid subtropical climate, abbreviated "Cfa" on climate maps.

Elected officials and staff 
As of August 2021, the Mayor of Onley is Matthew D. Hart. The Town Council consists of A. Brian Corbin, Billye D. Custis, William R. Ferguson, Claudia C. Harmon, Rose M. Pierson, and Woody W. Zember.  The Town Attorney is Carl Bundick.  The Town Chief of Police is Charles McPherson.

References

Towns in Accomack County, Virginia
Towns in Virginia